SLPS may refer to:
 Microsoft Software Licensing and Protection Services
 St. Louis Public Schools
 Samsung Local Purchasing System